Aleksandar Aleksandrov (born 9 April 1990 in Sofia) is an Azerbaijani rower of Bulgarian descent. He finished 5th in the single sculls at the 2012 Summer Olympics and 12th in the double sculls with Boris Yotov at the 2016 Summer Olympics.

With Yotov, he won the silver medal at the 2014 European Championships in the men's double sculls.  He had previously won a bronze medal in the single scull at the 2007 European Championship while rowing for Bulgaria.

For Azerbaijan, Aleksandrov won the U23 World Rowing title in the men's single sculls in 2012, having won silver in the same event in 2010.  He also won the junior world title in the men's single scull in 2007 and 2008, having won silver in 2006 (all rowing for Bulgaria).

References

External links
 
 
 

1990 births
Living people
Azerbaijani male rowers
Olympic rowers of Azerbaijan
Rowers at the 2012 Summer Olympics
Rowers at the 2016 Summer Olympics
Sportspeople from Sofia
Naturalized citizens of Azerbaijan
European Rowing Championships medalists
Azerbaijani people of Bulgarian descent